Cool Sax, Warm Heart is an album by American jazz saxophonist Eddie Harris recorded in 1964 and released on the Columbia label.

Reception
The Allmusic review states "some enjoyable moments, but for the most part it's mainly generic. Stick with his Atlantic material instead".

Track listing
All compositions by Eddie Harris except as indicated
 "Chicago Serenade" – 2:58 
 "Since I Fell for You" (Buddy Johnson) – 3:54 
 "Stum Stang" – 3:03 
 "Django's Castle" (Django Reinhardt) – 2:23 
 "More Soul, Than Soulful" – 4:24 
 "Everything Happens to Me" (Tom Adair, Matt Dennis) – 2:47 
 "But Not for Me" (George Gershwin, Ira Gershwin) – 4:26 
 "Brother Ed" – 7:01 
 "Hip Hoppin'" – 2:36

Personnel
Eddie Harris – tenor saxophone
Wynton Kelly – piano (tracks 1, 2, 6 & 7)
Warren Stephens – guitar  
Melvin Jackson – bass
Bucky Taylor – drums
The Malcom Dodds Singers – vocals
Other unidentified musicians
Tom Wilson - producer

References 

Eddie Harris albums
1964 albums
Columbia Records albums
Albums produced by Tom Wilson (record producer)